The 1978 NAIA Division II football season, as part of the 1978 college football season in the United States and the 23rd season of college football sponsored by the NAIA, was the ninth season of play of the NAIA's lower division for football.

The season was played from August to November 1978 and culminated in the 1978 NAIA Division II Football National Championship, played at Donnell Stadium in Findlay, Ohio.

Concordia–Moorhead defeated Findlay in the championship game, 7–0, to win their second NAIA national title.

Conference changes
 This is the final season that the Southern California Intercollegiate Athletic Conference is officially recognized as an NAIA football conferences. The SIAC has since become an NCAA Division III conference.

Conference standings

Conference champions

Postseason

See also
 1978 NAIA Division I football season
 1978 NCAA Division I-A football season
 1978 NCAA Division I-AA football season
 1978 NCAA Division II football season
 1978 NCAA Division III football season

References

 
NAIA Football National Championship